Aero NT-54 is a 1925 Soviet black-and-white silent film directed by Nikolai Petrov. Scriptwriter - Nikolai Surovtsev. The film was censored and banned on 1 December 1928 by Glavrepertkom.

Plot 
The plot of the film is based around a Soviet engineer who develops a fantastically powerful aircraft engine for airplanes. Too many parties, however, want to own this invention and so passions run high.

References

External links

Aero NT-54 at Kinopoisk.ru 

Soviet silent feature films
1925 films
Soviet science fiction adventure films
Soviet black-and-white films
Russian aviation films
Russian black-and-white films
1920s science fiction adventure films
Russian silent feature films
Russian science fiction adventure films
Silent science fiction adventure films